LP is the first and only album by the New York-based indie rock band Ambulance LTD. The album was released on March 23, 2004 in the US and March 14, 2005 in the UK by TVT Records. The album went on to sell more than 100,000 copies worldwide.

LP was promoted with the release of the singles "Heavy Lifting", "Stay Where You Are", and "Primitive (The Way I Treat You)" throughout late 2004 and 2005. Following the album's release, Ambulance LTD would go on to release one more EP, New English in 2006, before dissolving after a lengthy legal battle with TVT Records.

Track listing

Credits
 Recorded and mixed in London and New York City.
 Tracks 1, 3, 5, 9, and 11 produced by Ambulance LTD and Simon "Barny" Barnicott. Mixed by Simon "Barny" Barnicott.
 Track 2 produced by Ron A. Shaeffer and Ambulance LTD for Orchard Productions. Additional production and mix by Jim Abbiss. Mix engineered by Barny.
 Tracks 4, 7, 8, and 10 produced by Jim Abbiss. Mix engineered by Simon "Barny" Barnicott.
 Track 6 produced by Chris Zane and Ambulance LTD. Additional production and mix by Jim Abbiss. Mix engineered by Simon "Barny" Barnicott.
 Mastered by Emily Lazar at the Lodge.
 A&R - Leonard B. Johnson
 Art direction by Benjamin Wheelock.
 Design concept by Marcus Congleton.
 Still photography by John Wilkes. Band photography by Roger Sargent.

2004 debut albums
TVT Records albums
Ambulance LTD albums